Sidhi District is one of the tribal districts of Madhya Pradesh state of India. The town of Sidhi is the district headquarters. The district is part of Rewa Division.

History
Sidhi is a part of Madhya Pradesh. It forms the northeastern boundary of the state. Sidhi is known for its natural environment, historical importance and cultural roots. Sidhi has a number of natural resources with the river Son draining the district, and with coal deposits which feed major industries across the country.

This is the birthplace of Birbal. Located in the area is the Sanjay Tiger Reserve or Sanjay National Park which tells the magnificence of the Lions here. There is also a park - Parasli.

Divisions
Sidhi district comprises seven tehsils: Bahari, Churhat, Gopad Banas, Rampur Naikin, Majhauli, Kusmi and
Sihawal. There are four Madhya Pradesh Vidhan Sabha constituencies in this district, namely, Churhat, Sidhi, Sihawal and Dhauhani, all of which are part of Sidhi Lok Sabha constituency.

Economy
The Vindhyachal Super Thermal Power Station supplies electricity over a wide area. On one side the spectrum of its floristic socio-cultural diversity and ethnic history of tribal, the district has a panoramic view of the Kaimur, Kehejua and Ranimunda hills blazing with flowers of flame of forest and intoxicated by the sweet smell of mahua flowers. The whole of Sidhi district was part of Rewa state.The economy of this area mainly based on agriculture and allied activities.

In 2006 the Ministry of Panchayati Raj named Chamba one of the country's 250 most backward districts (out of a total of 640). It is one of the 24 districts in Madhya Pradesh currently receiving funds from the Backward Regions Grant Fund Programme (BRGF).

Rulers of Sidhi
In the 1800s, there were three separate rulers of Sidhi, ruling three parts of the territory:
 The Chandela rulers from Bardi (Khatai).
 The state of Balendu   rulers (Chedi dynasty) was in Marawas. These were the main rulers who ruled the jungles. His rule extended from Sasaram in Bihar to Sonbhadra in Uttar Pradesh, Mdwas in Sidhi district and Koriya district of Chhattisgarh. Whose capital was Marawas. They mainly had the largest number of elephants in the forests of the state.

After these came the Rajput Baghelas came from Kasauta, Rewa. They immigrated to Sidhi in the early 19th century. They ruled the western Sidhi territory (Churhat/Rampur) from then on till India gained independence. The last ruler of Churhat was Rao RanBahadur Singhji- elder brother of Arjun Singh.

Ambikehs Pratap Singh (Chhote Sarkar odani) younger brother of raja Tryambkesh Pratap Singh Bardi khatai he is a senior leader of the Madhyapradesh congress 

Raja Kant Deo Singh of Bardi Khatai continues to live in the ancestral Haveli located on the banks of the river Sone. He is an active member of the Bharatiya Janata Party.

His Highness Maharajadhiraja Shri Maharaja Sir Bhuvaneshwar Prasad Singh, Maharaja of Singrauli is the son in law of Arjun Singh. He was the president of the MP Mining Department and owner of all the coal mines in Rewa, Sidhi, Singrauli and Sonebhadra. He is an active member of Indian National Congress. The Maharajas of Singrauli had a hereditary 17 gun salute. Singrauli State was the largest state in the Bagelkhand Agency. Singrauli State was the second largest state in the Central India Agency.

Geography
Sidhi district is located on the Northeastern Boundary of the state between 22,475 and 24.4210 North Latitude and 81:1840 and 824830 East longitude. The district has Singrauli district in the north-east, and Uttar Pradesh Koriya district of Chhattisgarh on the east, and Rewa district on the west.

Sidhi District has a total population of 18,31,152 sharing almost 3.03% of the total population of erstwhile state of Madhya Pradesh in 2001.

Transportation

Air
Closest airport to Sidhi is in Allahabad which is 147 kilometers (91 miles).

Demographics

According to the 2011 census, Sidhi District has a population of 1,127,033, roughly equal to the nation of Cyprus or the US state of Rhode Island. This gives it a ranking of 411th in India (out of a total of 640). Its population growth rate over the decade 2001-2011 was 23.66%. Sidhi has a sex ratio of 952 females for every 1000 males, and a literacy rate of 66.09%. 8.26% of the population lives in urban areas. Scheduled Castes and Tribes made up 11.55% and 27.80% of the population respectively.

Languages

At the time of the 2011 Census of India, 63.39% of the population in the district spoke Hindi, 35.65% Bagheli and 0.79% Gondi as their first language.

Education

In 1980, at the time when Arjun Singh was the chief minister of Madhya Pradesh, a committee was formed to find out more about the educational system in Sidhi district. It was tasked to find out which was the first school in Sidhi district, and also, who was the first graduate.

It was popularly thought that Rajasahab Madhwas was the first graduate from Sidhi. The survey further revealed that Shri Divakar Bahadur Singh, village Jhalwar (Churhat), was the first graduate from Allahabad University. He had done his BA in 1924 and had proceeded to do his LLB also from Allahabd University in 1926. Thereafter he had come back to practice and settle in Jhalwar (Churaht) in Sidhi district. His successors are still present in Jhalwar. Among them, Batuk Pratap Singh (Jhalwar) is the source of information regarding the history events in the district.

It was also found that the first school in Sidhi was in Bardi. This school had started around 100 years before the survey, i.e. around the year 1880.

Tehsils of Sidhi 

 Churhat
 Gopadbanas
 Kusmi
 Majhauli
 Rampur Naikin
 Sihawal

Notable people
 Ajay Pratap Singh, Member of Parliament, Rajya Sabha
Birbal (born Mahesh Das in village Ghoghara in Block Sihawal, Sidhi), courtier in Raja Ramchandra Singh Darbar of Baghela Dynasty
Arjun Singh former CM of Madhya Pradesh
Riti Pathak, Member of Parliament, Parliamentary Constituency No. 11 Sidhi
Kunwar Singh Tekam, Member of Legislative Assembly, Assembly Constituency No. 82 Dhauhani, Former Chairman Of National Commission for Scheduled Tribes, Govt. Of India, New Delhi
Arunoday Singh, Indian film actor
Rohit Singh, Environmentalist , Currently Working with Biodiversity Foundation as a Scientific Supervisor at Tughlakabad Biodiversity Park , a Central Government Project .

Tourist places
 Sanjay National Park
 Chandreh temple
 Parsili rest house
 Shikarganj rest house, at the confluence of Son river and Mahan river
 Ghonghra temple, village where Birbal (Mahesh Das)was born.

References

External links
Sidhi District

 
Districts of Madhya Pradesh
Coal mining districts in India